Sitting volleyball was introduced as a full Paralympic event in 1976. The women's sitting volleyball event was also introduced in the 2004.

Medal summary
Men's sitting volleyball medal winning for every Summer Games as follows:

Women's sitting volleyball results:

Medals ranking:

References 

Volleyball at the Summer Paralympics